Josh Jenkins is a Nashville based singer/songwriter and lead singer of the band Green River Ordinance. Growing up, Jenkins spent time singing at local opries in Texas, and ultimately joined the band at 15 years old, where he spent 15 years as the lead singer. Jenkins now resides in Nashville, TN, largely focusing his craft on songwriting. Jenkins signed a worldwide publishing deal with powerhouse publisher SMACKsongs in late 2016. Jenkins’ songs have been recorded by artists such as Walker Hayes, Jordan Davis, Muscadine Bloodline, Randy Houser, and more. Jenkins has also started to release solo projects, including his first three singles, “Broken Record,” “Perfect Mess,” and “More Beautiful.”

Songwriting discography

References

External links 
 Josh Jenkins | Credits | AllMusic

Year of birth missing (living people)
Living people
Place of birth missing (living people)
Nationality missing
American male singer-songwriters
American country singer-songwriters
American country record producers